Legislative Assembly election was held in Haryana on 21 October 2019 to elect 90 members of the Haryana Legislative Assembly. The final voter turnout was recorded at 68.20%. The results were announced on 24 October 2019.

The Bharatiya Janata Party emerged as the single largest party and formed the government in a post-poll alliance with the Jannayak Janta Party and seven Independent MLAs. BJP's Manohar Lal Khattar and JJP President Dushyant Chautala were sworn in as Chief Minister and Deputy Chief Minister respectively of BJP-JJP alliance government.

In the previous election in 2014 , the Bharatiya Janata Party won a majority and ended the 10-year rule of the Congress government in the state and Manohar Lal Khattar became the Chief Minister.

Elections

Schedule

Voter turnout
After the final count the turnout was updated to 68.20%. Fatehabad 73.7%, Kaithal 73.3%, Jagadhari 73%, and Hathin 72.5% had highest turnout. Gurugram 51.2%, Badkhal 51.3%, and Tigaon 53.2% had lowest turnout of just above 50%.

Parties and alliances









Surveys and Polls

Vote share

Best Choice for Chief Minister

Seat Projections

Detailed Results

Democratic Standards

Performance of the political parties
During the election campaign, BJP had given the slogan of "75+" i.e. BJP will win more than 75 seats out of 90 seats in Haryana. But, BJP couldn't fulfill its target and it even lost the majority in the Legislative Assembly.

The INC emerged as the big gainer in the election. INC fought the election under the leadership of Selja Kumari and former chief minister Bhupinder Singh Hooda. Though INC couldn't reach the majority mark of 46 seats, it gained 15 seats in comparison to the previous election and won 30 seats.

"Aaya Ram Gaya Ram" phenomenon

 
To be updated.

Barrier to entry and politics of rich

 
83.3% (75 out of 90) are crorepati, that is, they own assets worth at least INR10,000,000. Average worth of 2019 assembly members is INR18.29 crore compare to INR12.97 crore in 2014. 93.5% of INC (29 of 31), 92.5% of BJP (37 of 40), and 70% of JJP (7 of 10) are crorepati. With INR25.26 crore per MLA, the average wealth of JJP is highest.

Casteism

 

To be updated.

Criminality

 
Association for Democratic Reforms (ADR), a think tank which does poll analysis for accountability and transparency in democracy, found that the 13.3% (12 of 90) elected MLAs face criminal cases, highest being 4 from INC, followed by 2 from BJP, 1 from JJP, and rest being independent or single MLA parties.

Dynastism and nepotism

 
Dynasts had field day in the election results, several dynasts across various parties won elections.

Highest number of dynasts won from INC, namely Bhupinder Singh Hooda from Ranbir Singh Hooda, Kiran Choudhry from Bansi Lal clan, Kuldeep Bishnoi from Bhajan Lal clan, Chiranjeev Rao from Ajay Singh Yadav clan, Varun Chaudhary from Phool Chand Mullana; as well as Rao Dan Singh related to Rao Narbir Singh Aftab Ahmed of Khursheed Ahmed clan, Amit Sihag Chautala is another dynast who became INC MLA from Dabwali, he is grandson of Devi Lal.

Dynasts who won from BJP are Dura Ram of Bhajan Lal clan.
 
Highest number of winning dynasts were from the Devi Lal's Chautala clan which had fielded 6 family members from different parties and 5 of them won including Dushyant Chautala and his mother Naina Singh Chautala from JJP, Abhay Singh Chautala from INLD, and INC rebel Ranjit Singh Chautala as independent candidate; as well as Amit Sihag Chautala from Dabwali as INC MLA. This was followed by 2 from Bhajan Lal clan, namely Kuldeep Bishnoi and Dura Ram. Lone HLP party MLA Gopal Kanda is also from political family as his father too had contested General Elections in the past on Jan Sangh ticket.

Lack of female empowerment
 
 
Only 9 (10% of total legislature membership) female candidate were elected, 4 from Congress, 3 from BJP, 1 from JJP and 1 independent.

Lack of educational and innovation standards of candidates

According to ADR report, only 69% (62 of 90) have at least a bachelor's degree, i.e. 31% lack even the basic degree,

Results by district

Results by constituency

See also

 2019 Indian general election in Haryana 
 2019 Maharashtra Legislative Assembly election
 2019 elections in India
 Elections in Haryana
 Political dynasties of Haryana and corruption

References

External links
 Haryana Assembly Election Result 2019 Counting Live on News Nation
 2019 Lok Sabha Polls on Moneycontrol.com
 2019 Haryana Assembly Polls on The Economic Times

State Assembly elections in Haryana
2010s in Haryana
Haryana